Alec Douglas Moores (December 30, 1919 – April 16, 2014) was a Canadian politician. He represented the electoral district of Harbour Grace in the Newfoundland and Labrador House of Assembly from 1966 to 1971. He was a member of the Liberal Party of Newfoundland and Labrador. He was a businessman.

References

1919 births
2014 deaths
Liberal Party of Newfoundland and Labrador MHAs